Soon may refer to:

Music 
 Soon (musical), a 1971 rock opera by Joseph M. Kookolis and Scott Fagan

Albums 
 Soon (album), a 1993 album by Tanya Tucker, and the title song (see below)
 Soon (EP), a 1997 EP by Far

Songs 
 "Soon" (1927 song), from the musical Strike Up the Band
 "Soon" (Tanya Tucker song), 1993
 "Soon", by Dexys Midnight Runners from BBC Radio One Live in Concert
 "Soon", by LeAnn Rimes from I Need You
 "Soon", by My Bloody Valentine from Glider
 "Soon", by Yes from The Gates of Delirium
 "Soon", from the film Mississippi
 "Soon", from the musical Bajour
 "Soon (I Like It)", by Imani Coppola from Chupacabra
 "Soon", by U2, used as the introduction music for shows during their 360° Tour

People with the surname 
 Sun (surname) or Soon, a transliteration of a common Chinese surname
 Lyndel Soon (born 1978), Malaysian pageant contestant and actress
 Willie Soon (born 1966), American astrophysicist